Rutronik Racing also known as HCB-Rutronik Racing is a German racing team from Remchingen. The team mainly competes in the ADAC GT Masters.

History 
Founded in 2010, the team competed in the FIA GT World Cup in 2018 as Audi Sport Team Rutronik. In 2019, the team entered the ADAC GT Masters. The team is a customer sport team from Audi Sport Customer Racing and uses 10 Audi GT3 cars in two championships.

The racing team won the driver and team classification in its debut season in 2019.

Rutronik Racing will field two Audi R8 LMS GT3 Evo II in 2022.

Current series results

ADAC GT Masters

Former series results

FIA GT World Cup

24 Hours of Spa

Weblinks 

 Official website

References 
Auto racing teams established in 2010
2010 establishments in Germany
German auto racing teams
ADAC GT Masters teams
Audi in motorsport
Remchingen